Bonli is a town and a tehsil in Sawai Madhopur district in the Indian state of Rajasthan. This city comes under Bamanwas Vidhan Sabha constituency of Sawai Madhopur district. Bonli is a Tehsil Headquarter of District Sawai Madhopur and Panchayat Samiti Headquarters. Balaji temple is located on Bonli – Lalsot Hai way.

Digital Pradhan E-mitra & CSC located in Bonli and provide services in Bonli, Sawai Madhopur and Newai Area.

emitra@whatsapp service of Digital Pradhan E-mitra & CSC is very popular among business and professional. emitra@whatsapp service solve two Mager problems for busy persons, first "Lack of time" and second "Lack of detailed information".

Demographics 
 India census,  Bonli had a population of 15,300. In which 7,874 are males and 7,426 females are included. The population of the age group of 0–6 years is 2,299 which is 15.03% of the total population. Literacy is 73.23% which is higher than the state average of 66.11%. Male literacy is 86.91% and female literacy rate is 58.85%.Males constitute 50.30% of the population and females 49.70%. Niwai, Sawai Madhopur, Lalsot  and Newai are the nearby other Cities to Bonli.

Hospitals 

 Government Hospital Bonli
 Govt Aayurvedic Ausadhalya Jhanoon

See also 
 Sawai Madhopur
 Ranthambore National Park
 Ranthambore Fort

References

Bonli 

Cities and towns in Sawai Madhopur district